Schizopetalidae is a family of crested millipedes in the  order Callipodida. There are more than 10 genera in Schizopetalidae.

The Schizopetalidae subfamily Tynommatinae was recently elevated in rank to family (Tynommatidae), which resulted in the transfer of these 12 genera to the new family: 
Aspidiophon, Caliactis, Colactis, Colactoides, Diactis, Etiron, Florea, Heptium, Idrionaria, Mexicopetalum, Texophon, and Tynomma.

Genera

 Acanthopetalum Verhoeff, 1900
 Apfelbeckia Verhoeff, 1896
 Balkanopetalum Verhoeff, 1926
 Callipodella Verhoeff, 1900
 Dischizopetalum Verhoeff, 1900
 Eurygyrus Koch & C.L., 1847
 Euxinopetalum Hoffman, 1973
 Himatiopetalum Verhoeff, 1900
 Micropodella 
 Prolysiopetalum Verhoeff, 1909
 Schizopetalum Verhoeff, 1900

References

Further reading

External links

 

Callipodida
Millipedes of North America
Millipede families